Dayna Smith (born 1962) is an American photojournalist. She worked at The Washington Post for 21 years before going freelance. In 1999 she won World Press Photo of the Year.

Life and work
Smith was born in Minot, North Dakota in 1962. She began her career at The Palm Beach Post in Florida and at The Washington Times. In 1985 she joined the staff of The Washington Post, where she worked for 21 years as a photographer, assignment editor and picture editor. In 2007 she went freelance.

Smith spent two weeks in Kosovo in October and November 1998 covering the Kosovo War for The Washington Post. A photograph from that time "of a grieving young woman whose husband had been killed the day before" won the 1999 World Press Photo of the Year. Smith is one of only four women to have won the award since its foundation in 1955.

References

External links

The Washington Post journalists
American photojournalists
21st-century American photographers
20th-century American photographers
Photographers from North Dakota
Kent State University alumni
People from Minot, North Dakota
Place of birth missing (living people)
Living people
1962 births
20th-century American women photographers
21st-century American women photographers
Women photojournalists